Michael Ronald John Kenward  (born 12 July 1945) is a British science writer who was Editor of New Scientist 1979–1990.  He was awarded the OBE in 1990.

References

External links 
 Official website

1945 births
Living people
British science writers
British magazine editors
Officers of the Order of the British Empire
New Scientist people